AddSearch is a Helsinki-based company providing a hosted site search service that allows its user to set up a site search engine with a search API.

History
The company was founded in 2013 by Antti Ala-Ilkka, Mikko Nurminen and Pasi Ilola and is headquartered in Helsinki, Finland.

AddSearch was launched directly in competition to now-discontinued Google Site Search. AddSearch was built to allow simple customization control over search results from the site.

AddSearch is available for both large enterprises as well as bloggers and small websites, with price scaling up depending on the amount of content on the website.

References

External links
Official website

Companies based in Helsinki
Internet search engines
Search engine software